Kafétien Gomis (born 23 March 1980 in Saint-Quentin, Aisne) is a French long jumper. His personal best jump is 8.24 metres, achieved in August 2010.

He finished ninth at the 2003 Summer Universiade, seventh at the 2005 Summer Universiade, fifth at the 2006 European Athletics Championships and fourth at the 2007 European Athletics Indoor Championships. He also competed in the 2004 Olympics, but failed to qualify from his qualification pool.

He came fourth at the 2009 European Athletics Indoor Championships with an indoor personal best of 8.12 metres and he represented France later that year at the 2009 World Championships in Athletics (although he did not make the final). He was knocked out in the qualification round at the 2010 IAAF World Indoor Championships but he excelled outdoors that season, jumping a best of 8.24 m to win the silver medal at the 2010 European Athletics Championships – his first major medal.

Personal bests

All information taken from IAAF profile.

Achievements

References

External links

1980 births
Living people
French male long jumpers
Athletes (track and field) at the 2004 Summer Olympics
Athletes (track and field) at the 2016 Summer Olympics
Olympic athletes of France
European Athletics Championships medalists
World Athletics Championships athletes for France
Competitors at the 2003 Summer Universiade
Athletes (track and field) at the 2005 Mediterranean Games
Athletes (track and field) at the 2009 Mediterranean Games
Mediterranean Games competitors for France
People from Saint-Quentin, Aisne
Sportspeople from Aisne
20th-century French people
21st-century French people